"I Need You," released in 1972, is the second single by the band America from their eponymous debut album America. The song was written by Gerry Beckley.

Cash Box described it as "a gentle, 'Something'-ish ballad."

It appears on the live albums Live (1977), In Concert (1985), In Concert (King Biscuit), Horse With No Name - Live! (1995), and The Grand Cayman Concert (2002). The studio version is included on the compilation albums Highway (2000) and The Complete Greatest Hits (2001).

George Martin remixed the studio recording for inclusion on History: America's Greatest Hits (1975) with the pitch brought down a quarter tone and the bass guitar brought up further in volume from the original release.  An alternate mix from 1971 (otherwise based on the George Martin mix) appears on the 2015 release Archives, Vol. 1.

Personnel 
(Per back cover of 1972 vinyl issue of America.)
 Dewey Bunnell – 6-string acoustic guitar, backing vocals
 Gerry Beckley – lead vocal, bass, piano
 Dan Peek – 12-string electric guitar, backing vocals
 Dave Atwood - drums

Charts

The song was a top ten hit and spent 10 weeks in United States Billboard Hot 100 charts wherein it peaked at number 9. It was the band's second top ten single, following the success of their previous hit "A Horse With No Name". It was also charted in Billboard Adult Contemporary Chart at number 7, and both Cash Box Singles Chart and Record World Singles Chart at number 8. Unlike their previous hit single, it didn't receive any certifications by RIAA.

Cover versions
Andy Williams released a version in 1972 on his album, Alone Again (Naturally).  In the same year Percy Faith and Ray Conniff also released versions of the song.<ref>[http://www.allmusic.com/album/love-theme-from-the-godfather-mw0000855445 Ray Conniff, Love Theme from 'The Godfather'''] Retrieved March 25, 2016</ref>

Harry Nilsson recorded the song for his 1976 album ...That's the Way It Is''.

See also 
 List of Billboard Hot 100 top 10 singles in 1972

References

External links
 

1971 songs
1972 singles
Songs written by Gerry Beckley
America (band) songs
Andy Williams songs
Warner Records singles
Rock ballads
Song recordings produced by Ian Samwell